Joseph Magnani (July 15, 1911 – November 30, 1975) was an American road cyclist, who competed as a professional from 1935 to 1948.

Early life
Joseph Magnani was born in LaSalle, Illinois, to John and Gonda Magnani, who were Italian immigrants. His father was a coal miner. Shortly after his birth, the family moved to Mount Clare, Illinois, where his father continued to work as a miner.

Career
In 1928 at the age of 16, he and his sister Angeline moved to France to live with relatives, where he began to take an interest in cycling competitions. Here he also met his wife Erminia (Mimi) Soria. There he joined a local amateur team. After winning the Grand Prix Urago in 1935, Magnani was offered a contract with a team sponsored by Urago Cycles. His first major win came the same year in the 1935 Marseille–Nice, when he attacked the peloton near the end of the race and held the chasers off to the line. Magnani continued to have success in the next few seasons, having finished 9th overall in the 1938 Paris–Nice, after moving into the top 10 overall due to finishing ahead of the peloton in a breakaway on the penultimate stage. He also gained additional attention in the press for being the only American professional cyclist in Europe, earning him the nickname "L'Américain". However, he never was able to compete in the Tour de France because the race was between national teams at the time.

For the 1939 season, Magnani moved to the Terrot–Hutchinson team, winning several more races including the first stage of the Tour du Sud-Est.

His career was cut short by World War II and his imprisonment in a concentration camp, where he was kept for 18 months, losing over 70 pounds in the process. After his release, he returned to competition and represented the United States at the 1947 UCI Road World Championships in Reims, where he finished seventh and yet was the final finisher due to extremely hot weather, forcing many top names including Fausto Coppi to abandon the race.

Magnani competed in his only Grand Tour at the 1946 Giro d'Italia with Olmo team owned by former professional cyclist Giuseppe Olmo. However, he was forced to abandon the race after suffering a crash. This also made him the first American to compete in the race.

In 1948, he returned to the United States for a family reunion, and decided to return to living there after receiving a contract with the Schwinn Bicycle Company to compete in six-day races.

He died from Parkinson's disease in Oak Park in the suburbs of Chicago on November 30, 1975. He was inducted into the United States Bicycling Hall of Fame in 1998.

Major results

1935
 1st Marseille–Nice
 1st Grand Prix d'Urago
1936
 1st Grand Prix d'Urago
 2nd Nice–Annot–Nice
1937
 1st Nice–Annot–Nice
1938
 1st 
 1st Marseille–Toulon–Marseille
 1st Circuit des cols pyrénéens
 2nd Overall Tour de l'Est Central
1st Stages 4 & 5
 2nd Nice–Annot–Nice
 9th Overall Paris–Nice
1939
 1st Lyon–Saint-Étienne–Lyon
 1st Stage 1 Tour du Sud-Est
 1st Stage 1 Circuit du Provence
 1st Stage 2 Circuit des Alpes
1940
 1st 
 1st Grand Prix de la Côte d'Azur
 1st Tour de Porto Alegre
1941
 1st Stage 1 Circuit du Mont Ventoux
 10th Grand Prix des Nations
1942
 2nd Circuit de la Haute-Savoie
1946
 2nd Grand Prix des Alpes
1947
 3rd Tour du Lac Léman
 3rd Circuit des cols pyrénéens
 7th Road race, UCI Road World Championships

References

External links

1911 births
1975 deaths
American male cyclists
People from LaSalle, Illinois
Sportspeople from Chicago